Battista Antonelli (or Bautista) (1547–1616) was a military engineer from a prestigious Italian family of military engineers in the service of the Habsburg monarchs of Austria and Spain.

Biography

Antonelli was born in Gatteo in Romagna, and entered the service of Philip II of Spain in 1570, working with his older brother on projects in Oran, Algeria and Spain.  In 1581 Antonelli was commissioned by the king to build a fortress along the Straits of Magellan, to protect this vital sea lane from attacks by English privateers.  The project, under the command of Pedro Sarmiento de Gamboa and Diego Flores Valdez, was a complete failure, founding a short-lived settlement named Rey Don Felipe (later called Port Famine), without any fortifications.  Antonelli returned to Spain, ill and disillusioned.  
He was convinced, however, to take a second commission in 1586 to build fortifications for the city of Cartagena in Colombia.  Using the latest military technology of the time, he designed the city's renowned defenses, the San Felipe de Barajas Castle, the San Sebastián de Pastelillo Fort and the San Fernando Fort.

Antonelli then sailed for Panama where he recommended the abandonment of Nombre de Dios in favor of Portobelo. At Panama la Vieja at the Pacific coast he developed a plan for a fortification of the town, which was never realized. He then set sail for Havana.  In Havana he designed the fortifications which culminate at the fortress of El Morro.  From there he returned to Spain.

After several more journeys to the Caribbean, Antonelli settled in Spain, working on fortresses in Gibraltar and in other places.  He died in Spain in 1616 after having one of the most illustrious careers in military architecture in the New World.

His brother Giovanni Battista Antonelli was also a military engineer, born in Italy at Gatteo in Romagna, and died in Toledo, Spain, in 1558. His most important works were a series of watchtowers along the coast of the Mediterranean Sea in Spain.

References 

Anne W. Tennant (September/October 2003) "Arquitecto de las defensas del rey," Américas, pp. 6–15.
 

Italian military engineers
Spanish architects
People of the Spanish colonial Americas
1547 births
1616 deaths
Colonial Puerto Rico
Spanish colonial period of Cuba
Spanish West Indies
16th-century South American people
17th-century South American people
16th-century Italian architects
16th-century Italian engineers
17th-century Italian architects
17th-century Italian engineers